Stirling Terrace, Albany is a street in the centre of Albany, Western Australia adjoining York Street.

As a historic street and part of a historic precinct it has a number of listed heritage buildings that look out over the Albany Harbour, including Argyle House.

Stirling Terrace has appeared on maps of the town since 1834 and is named after James Stirling, the first Governor of Western Australia.

The 1835 Hillman survey plan established the road as the prime location in the town, with a  variety of social, commercial, leisure, institutional and service functions. The town jetty and railway station both had frontage along Stirling Terrace making it a transport hub of the town. The Empire theatre was also built along Stirling Terrace.

During the 1870s and 1880s much of the frontage along Stirling Terrace to the east of York Street was filled. John Moir built a store, the Argyll buildings were erected, and a branch of the National Bank (known as Vancouver House) was constructed in 1881. Alexander Moir established Glasgow House and Edinburgh House in 1882, the Union Bank of Australia building (known as Albany House) was built in 1884, followed by the Royal George Hotel in 1885 and then the White Star Hotel. The Commercial Bank building, later a branch of the Western Australian Bank, was built in 1891.

The 1897 development of Jubilee Gardens along the slope between the upper and lower terrace made the area created a recreational centre for the area. The Jubilee Bandstand, found within the gardens, was opened in 1898.

It was the main street of early Albany and by 1900 four hotels, three banks, three department stores, shipping agencies as well as numerous other small businesses were found along the Terrace.

The laying of the foundation stone for the Albany Courthouse was held in 1896, with the building completed and opened in 1898. 
 
The London Hotel was built along Stirling Terrace in 1909. It was built on the site of the Chusan Hotel which had stood on the site since 1849 and was rebuilt in 1871.

The Empire Buildings were constructed on the corner of Stirling Terrace and York Street in 1912, comprising a 1,000-seat theatre and shops.

To the west of the intersection with York Street is the Albany Courthouse.
To the east of the intersection, there are a number of heritage properties including the Jubilee Bandstand and Albany Post Office on the southern side of the terrace and the White Star Hotel on the northern side.

Like York Street, it was frequently photographed as streetscape representative of the prosperity of the town.

See also
 List of places on the State Register of Heritage Places in the City of Albany

Notes

 
Streets in Albany, Western Australia